Eemeli Virtanen (born 4.9 2002) is a Finnish ice hockey defenceman who reprecents Porin Ässät of the Finnish elite league "Liiga". In the 2021-22 season Virtanen played his first professional game on the 8th of October 2021 against SaiPa. Before that he had played in the U20 team.

Career 
Virtanen started his hockey career in Ässät. In the 2017-18 season he had the most goals for a defenceman in his team. 

Before the start of the 2021-22 season Virtanen signed a 2+1 type of contract with Ässät.

Virtanen ended his season in an injury.

Personal life 
Virtanen's grandfather Anto Virtanen played as a forward in the SM-sarja for Pori Bears and Ässät in a total of 315 matches in 1961–1975. He won two Finnish championships. Eemel's uncle Jaakko Virtanen played as a forward in Ässät, he played 167 Liiga matches in 1983–1989. He is now a member of the club's board. Eemeli's cousin and Jaakko's son Jami Virtanen plays as a forward as Eemeli's teammate in Ässät.

Virtanen graduated from the Porin Suomalainen Yhteislyseon Lukio in 2021.

References 

Ässät players
Finnish ice hockey defencemen
2002 births
People from Pori
Living people